Calochortus monanthus is a presumed extinct North American species of flowering plant in the lily family known by the common names single-flowered mariposa lily and Shasta River mariposa lily. It was endemic to northern California.

It is presumed extinct, having been collected and documented once over a century ago and never found again. The single known specimen was collected by botanist Edward Lee Greene from a meadow on the banks of the Shasta River, near Yreka in Siskiyou County, California, in June 1876.

Description
Calochortus monanthus had an unbranching stem and an inflorescence of a single erect, bell-shaped flower on a long peduncle. The flower had three sepals about 4 centimeters long and three toothed petals each between 4 and 5 centimeters. The petals were pinkish with a dark red spot at each base.

References

External links
Jepson Manual Treatment of Calochortus monanthus
USDA Plants Profile for Calochortus monanthus

monanthus
Endemic flora of California
Flora of the Klamath Mountains
Extinct flora of North America
Natural history of Siskiyou County, California
Plants described in 1940
Plant extinctions since 1500